Changkat Constituency (SMC) was a single member constituency in Tampines, Singapore. It existed only in 1984 to 1988, which was carved from Tampines SMC and most of the portion rejoined Tampines GRC in 1988 while the remaining portion was absorbed into Changi SMC.

Member of Parliament

Elections

Elections in 1980s

References

1984 General Election's result

Singaporean electoral divisions
Pasir Ris